Death To The World is an Eastern Orthodox zine published in the United States.

History 
Death to the World was started by monks and nuns from the St Herman of Alaska Monastery in Platina, California, as a medium of evangelism to teens involved in the punk subculture by monastics who were ex-punks. A founding member was Justin Marler who, soon after recording Volume One with seminal doom metal band Sleep in 1991, left for seven years of monastic life while Sleep went on to become metal icons.

Originally, the monastics planned to submit an article about Fr. Seraphim Rose to the magazine Maximum RocknRoll. They later decided to try to place an ad for their monastery, but were rejected, being told that the magazine "only [ran] ads for music and zines". This inspired them to begin a zine.

The first issue was printed in the December of '94 featuring a monk holding a skull on cover. The hand-drawn bold letters across the top read "DEATH TO THE WORLD, The Last True Rebellion" and the back cover held the caption: "they hated me without a cause." ...  The first issue, decorated with ancient icons and lives of martyrs inside, was advertised in Maximum RocknRoll and brought letters from all around the world.

The 'zine continued to be published and distributed at punks shows and underground hangouts. It was estimated that at one time, there were 50,000 in circulation. The monastics put out 12 issues in all, after which they continued distributing the 'zine but didn't publish new issues.

Eight years later, the zine was revived by convert members of Saint Barnabas Antiochian Orthodox Church in Costa Mesa, California. New issues are submitted to the St Herman monks for editing and revision, and are released quarterly.

The zine had a considerable impact on counter culture youth during the mid to late 90s, which caught the attention of mainstream press, and quickly led to the release of Justin Marler's first book in 1997, Youth of the Apocalypse, (co-authored with a fellow monastic).

References

Bibliography

 Death to the World vol. 1
 Death to the World vol. 2
 Death to the World vol. 3
 Death to the World vol. 4
 Death to the World vol. 5

 Death to the World vol. 6
 Death to the World vol. 7
 Death to the World vol. 8
 Death to the World vol. 9
 Death to the World vol. 10
 Death to the World vol. 11

External links

Death to the World Zine
St. Barnabas Antiochian Orthodox Church in Costa Mesa, CA
Waltz, Mitzi. "Alternative and Activist Media", Edinburgh University Press, Published 2005.
Athitakis, Mark. "Riff Raff", SF Weekly, 2000. Retrieved November 4, 2008.
Duncan Collum, Danny. "Punks to Monks", Utne Reader, 1997. Retrieved October 27, 2005.
Review, Youth of the Apocalypse. "Reviews" Amazon.com, June 20, 2005. Retrieved November 4, 2008.
Moon.com. "About the Author", moon.com, Retrieved November 4, 2008.
Uttertrash.net, "Rock and Soul, an Interview with Justin Marler", Retrieved November 4, 2008.

Music magazines published in the United States
Quarterly magazines published in the United States
Christian punk
Christian magazines
Eastern Orthodoxy in the United States
Magazines established in 1994
Magazines published in California
Punk zines